Anetoderma is a localized laxity of the skin with herniation or outpouching resulting from abnormal dermal elastic tissue. Anetoderma comes in three types:
 Primary anetoderma
 Jadassohn–Pellizzari anetoderma is a benign condition with focal loss of dermal elastic tissue. Jadassohn-Pellizzari is one of two major classifications of primary anetoderma, the other being Schweninger–Buzzi anetoderma. The difference between the two is that Jadassohn–Pellizzari anetoderma is preceded by inflammatory lesions.
 Schweninger–Buzzi anetoderma is a cutaneous condition characterized by loss of dermal elastic tissue.
 Secondary anetoderma
 Familial anetoderma

See also 
 List of cutaneous conditions

References

External links 

Abnormalities of dermal fibrous and elastic tissue